New Karimganj, also spelled as New Kareemganj or simply Karimganj, is a residential neighborhood under the Civil Lines thana zone of Gaya, Bihar, India, inhabited mostly by Muslims. Forming the western wing of the larger Karimganj neighborhood, it shares its proximity with Old Karimganj neighborhood to the east and Jagdeo Nagar to the north. The locality is popular for serving the Creane Memorial High School and is infamous for its congested alleyways.

Notable landmarks 

 Creane Memorial High School

Notable people 

 Hussain Ul Haque
 Dr. Syed Ahmad Qadri (Indian poet and writer)

References 

Neighbourhoods in Bihar
Gaya district